The Sierra Nevada bighorn sheep (Ovis canadensis sierrae) is subspecies of bighorn sheep unique to the Sierra Nevada mountains of California. A 2016 genetics study confirmed significant divergence between the three subspecies of North America's bighorn sheep: Sierra Nevada bighorn sheep, Rocky Mountain bighorn sheep and desert bighorn sheep. Sierra Nevada bighorn sheep were listed as a federally endangered subspecies in 2000. In 2016, over 600 Sierra bighorn remained in the wild.

Physical characteristics

Sierra Nevada bighorn range in color from white to dark brown, with a white rump and dark tail. There is some seasonal change in coloration due to the shedding of a thicker winter layer. Specialized hooves with adhesive soles provide traction in steep rocky terrain. The horns of both rams and ewes are composed of a dense layer of keratin covering a core of bone.

The average lifespan for Sierra Nevada bighorn males and females has been observed as 8 to 12 years.

Behavior
Sierra Nevada bighorn sheep are gregarious, with group size and composition depending on gender and season. Spatial segregation by gender occurs outside of the mating season. Bighorn sheep ewes generally remain with the same band in which they were born. Males older than two years of age remain apart from females and younger males for most of the year. During the late fall and winter, the groups come together and concentrate in suitable winter habitat. During this time, males compete for dominance with behaviors like horn clashes. Breeding takes place in late fall, generally November and December. Lambing occurs between late April and early July on safe, precipitous, rocky slopes; most lambs in the Sierra Nevada are born in May and June. Ewes and lambs often occupy steep terrain that provides a diversity of exposures and slopes for escape cover.

Habitat
Sierra bighorn are found in portions of the Sierra Nevada from Yosemite National Park to Olancha Peak. Sierra bighorn inhabit open areas where the land is rocky, sparsely vegetated, and characterized by steep slopes and canyons. Wehausen provides a detailed description of Sierra bighorn habitat throughout their range. Bighorn prefer open ground with high visibility to better detect predators and allow enough time to reach steep, rocky areas (escape terrain). Forests and thick brush are usually avoided if possible.

During winter, some bighorn occupy high-elevation, windswept ridges, while others migrate to lower elevations to avoid deep snow and to find forage.

Diet

Sierra bighorn are ruminant herbivores with four-chambered stomachs. Bighorn are primarily grazers, consuming various grasses, forbs, and woody vegetation depending on season and location. Naturally occurring mineral licks provide necessary minerals for bone and muscle growth.

Endangerment
Centuries of unregulated hunting, disease outbreaks, and mountain lion predation took a heavy toll on the Sierra bighorn population. However, disease played the largest role in the decline of the subspecies with domestic sheep transmitting virulent diseases, in particular pneumonia from Pasteurella, beginning in the 1870s. By the 1970s about 250 animals remained, occupying only two small areas of their former vast range. Translocations by the California Department of Fish and Wildlife (CDFW) helped to reestablish bighorn herds in historic habitat, but in spite of these efforts the population hit a low of about 100 total individuals in 1995. On January 3, 2000, Sierra bighorn were listed as a federally endangered subspecies.

Species recovery
In 1999, CDFW was made the lead agency responsible for implementing Sierra bighorn recovery. A group of stakeholders drafted the Sierra Nevada Bighorn Sheep Recovery Plan, and CDFW formed the Sierra Nevada Bighorn Sheep Recovery Program to work toward the goals of the Recovery Plan. Since then conditions have been particularly favorable for population growth, with the total number of individuals reaching about 250 by 2002 and about 600 in 2016. The Recovery Program continues to monitor population growth, habitat use, and cause-specific mortality of Sierra bighorn, and to carry out augmentations and translocations in an effort to achieve recovery goals.

In 2014, fourteen Sierra Nevada bighorn sheep were flown to Big Arroyo in Sequoia National Park via helicopter to establish a population on the western side of the Sierra Crest.

References

Ovis
Endemic fauna of California
Sierra Nevada bighorn sheep
Mammals of the United States
Sierra Nevada bighorn sheep
ESA endangered species